Ahmed Shah Durrani (born 16 May 1975) is an Afghan cricket umpire. He stood in his first Twenty20 International (T20I) match between the United Arab Emirates and Afghanistan on 14 December 2016. He stood in his first One Day International (ODI) match between Afghanistan and Ireland on 17 March 2017.

See also
 List of One Day International cricket umpires
 List of Twenty20 International cricket umpires

References

External links
 

1975 births
Living people
Afghan One Day International cricket umpires
Afghan Twenty20 International cricket umpires
Sportspeople from Jalalabad